The Chartered Institute of Procurement & Supply (CIPS),  formerly the Chartered Institute of Purchasing & Supply, is a global professional body working for the procurement and supply profession in many regions of the world. It promotes best practice and provides services for non-professionals and its over 64,000 members in 180 countries.

It received its Royal Charter from Queen Elizabeth II in 1992, and offered its members Chartered Status in 2014; members are eligible for Chartered Status after completing a programme of continuing professional development including the successful completion of the CIPS ethics test.

CIPS promotes and develops high standards of professional skill, ability, and integrity among all those engaged in procurement and supply chain management. Its headquarters are located in Easton on the Hill, just inside Northamptonshire, near Stamford, Lincolnshire but it has offices around the world and partnerships in other countries where it has a presence.

CIPS office locations
CIPS Australia and New Zealand
CIPS Hong Kong Branch
CIPS Middle East and North Africa. In the Middle East and North Africa (MENA) region, CIPS has branches in Abu Dhabi and Dubai, Egypt and Qatar.
Ghana office in Accra, opened 2017

Publications
The institute's official magazine is Supply Management, published monthly by Haymarket.

CIPS also publishes a range of special reports as part of its SM Insider programme and other reaction reports on key topics such as Brexit.

See also
 Procurement
 Supply Chain
 Purchasing
Institute for Supply Management, professional body for procurement and supply management in the United States

References

External links
 
 Supply Management

1932 establishments in the United Kingdom
Organizations established in 1932
Procurement
Procurement and Supply
Organisations based in Northamptonshire